Steve Nesser is a professional skateboarder from Minneapolis, Minnesota.

His current sponsors include Send Help Skateboards, Spitfire Wheels, Hard Luck Bearings, and Lakai Limited Footwear.

Personal life
Nesser has a daughter, Rowan Grey Nesser, born in 2009.

He has two sisters, one named Natalie Nesser who is a photographer and another named Adrienne Nesser, who has been married to Green Day frontman Billie Joe Armstrong since 1994.
His mother Joann Nesser is the founder and retired Executive Director of Christos Center for Spiritual Formation. Joann served on the Coordinating Council for Spiritual Directors International and has taught about contemplative prayer and spiritual formation at retreats, churches and conferences through the U.S., Europe and Africa. Joann has published several books on prayer and holds retreats with teachings on prayer and the spiritual life.

References

American skateboarders
Sportspeople from Minneapolis
Living people
Year of birth missing (living people)
Place of birth missing (living people)